Mayak Shangina is a mountain in Altai Krai, Russia. At  it is the highest point of Altai Krai. 

The summit was formerly unnamed. The choosing of the name followed a 2011 initiative of local paper Altayskaya Pravda journalist Anatoly Muravlev, who came up with the idea to give the peak an official name on the occasion of the 75th anniversary of the establishment of the Altai Territory. The name Mayak Shangina honors ethnographer, geologist and botanist Peter Shangin (1741 - 1816) and it was ratified and officially adopted in 2013.

Description
Mayak Shangina is the highest summit in the Korgon Range, part of the Altai Mountains, South Siberian System. It rises at the southern end of the Altai Krai, in an area of the  Charyshsky District that borders with the Ust-Kansky District of the Altai Republic.

See also
List of highest points of Russian federal subjects
List of mountains and hills of Russia

References

External links
Улицы столицы — пр-д Петра Шангина
The highest peaks in Russia
Highest points of Russian federal subjects
Landforms of Altai Krai
Altai Mountains

ru:Маяк Шангина